Oberdorf is a former commune in the Haut-Rhin department in north-eastern France. On 1 January 2016, it was merged into the new commune Illtal.

See also
 Communes of the Haut-Rhin department

References

Former communes of Haut-Rhin